Megachile flavipes is a species of bee in the family Megachilidae. It was described by Spinola in 1838.

References

Flavipes
Insects described in 1838